Gabriel Kreuther is a two-Michelin-star restaurant named after its chef and owner, Gabriel Kreuther. It was initially a one-star Michelin restaurant in its opening years and was subsequently awarded two stars in 2019. The restaurant specializes in modern Alsatian food with other French, German, and American influences. Their most famous dish is a sturgeon & sauerkraut tart with a caviar mousseline smoked in applewood. The restaurant also serves multiple house breads, including a savory kugelhopf with scallions and chive fromage blanc. Relais & Châteaux and entities such as Wine Enthusiast Magazine and Wine Spectator praised their varied wine list, primarily featuring wines from France, Germany, and other countries. Along with wine, their drinks include a variety of modern cocktails and traditional drinks from the chef's home region, including schnapps. Their current wine director is Aukai Bell.

Their main dinner menu has a choice between two different tasting menus with a table located in their kitchen. There is also a less expensive pre-theater menu, a lunch menu with prix fixe options, and a large bar. Their bar offers a mix of modern and traditional cocktails. The restaurant offers a modern take on comfort food from Alsace, including flammekueche (a type of open tart), sausages, and à la carte dishes from their main menu. The restaurant was rated by Grub Street as having the best bar food in the city. While the food is considered to be Haute Cuisine, the restaurant is notably business casual, with Kreuther noting that this allows for a more "comfortable environment" without the hassle of needing a suit or jacket.

The chef

The owner initially worked in restaurants across France, Switzerland, and Germany before moving to the United States. In the US, he worked at La Caravelle, a classic French restaurant, and as Chef De Cuisine at Atelier, a Mediterranean restaurant at the Ritz-Carlton. At his prior restaurant, The Modern, a Danny Meyer restaurant located inside the Museum of Modern Art, he worked as an executive chef. Gabriel gained the prestigious James Beard Award, his first Michelin star, and first worked with Marc Aumont, his current pastry chef. He was also named one of Food & Wine Magazine's Best New Chefs in 2003.

In November 2021, he collaborated with Michael Ruhlman to publish his first book, Gabriel Kreuther: The Spirit of Alsace, a Cookbook. The book contains recipes from his eponymous restaurant, memories of Alsace, and classics from Alsatian cuisine with a foreword by Jean-Georges Vongerichten.

Chocolate store
Marc Aumont, his pastry chef, opened Kreuther Handcrafted Chocolate next door to the restaurant in 2016. It specializes in a variety of different flavored truffles/bonbons as well as "cheesecake" macarons, a chocolate-tasting menu, and a variety of pastries and drinks. Their bourbon chocolate bar won silver at The International Chocolate Awards.  Multiple of their other truffles, such as their pumpkin sesame mole and forbidden rice, have won awards from there as well. More locally, their Middle Eastern Crunch, a halvah and pistachio bar, was noted by New York Magazine. Their iced hot chocolate is noted as one of the best in the city by the New York Post. Eater awarded it one of the top chocolate shops in America as well. During the Covid pandemic, the store closed in February 2020, and they now sell their chocolates and pastries via their website.

Awards
The New York Times awarded the restaurant three stars in 2015.

AAA Five Star Award (2015-2022)

New York Magazine awarded it an 86/100.

They have been a member of Relais & Châteaux since 2017.

In 2017, they were added as a top 100 restaurant by Wine Enthusiast as well as a Best Award of Excellence. Wine Spectator also praised their wine list.

In 2019, they gained a second star by Michelin.

In 2022, they won the Grand Award from Wine Spectator for wine program of the year along with Press in Napa Valley.

References

External links
 Official website
 Forbes

French restaurants in New York City
German restaurants in the United States
Restaurants in Manhattan
Restaurants established in 2015
2015 establishments in New York City
Michelin Guide starred restaurants in New York (state)
Midtown Manhattan